The Valdai Discussion Club is a Moscow-based think tank and discussion forum. It was established in 2004 and is named after Lake Valdai, which is located close to Veliky Novgorod, where the Club’s first meeting took place. In 2014, the management of the Club was transferred to the Valdai Club Foundation, established in 2011 by the Council on Foreign and Defence Policy, the Russian International Affairs Council, Moscow State Institute of International Relations, and the Higher School of Economics. British journalist Angus Roxburgh described it as part of the Russian propaganda effort.

Overview 
The 2004 Valdai conference was attended by Russian President Vladimir Putin.  Among many other Russian Government officials attending Valdai meetings are Dmitry Medvedev, Prime Minister and former President; Sergey Ivanov, former Chief of Staff of the Presidential Executive Office; Sergey Lavrov, Minister of Foreign Affairs; Sergey Shoygu, Minister of Defence.

Professors and scholars from major world universities and think tanks have participated in Valdai. The Club also operates regional programmes – Asian, Mid-Eastern  and Euro-Atlantic Dialogues. It holds a special session at the St. Petersburg International Economic Forum and the Eastern Economic Forum. Stanislav Zas, Secretary-General of the Collective Security Treaty Organization spoke at Valdai in February 2022.

Daniel W. Drezner, professor of international politics at the Fletcher School of Law and Diplomacy at Tufts University, described Valdai as "a swanky high-level conference put on by the Russian elite" and "the highest-profile Russian equivalent to Davos (minus the corporate presence)". Drezner also wrote that the chief value to attendees is the ability to determine the official line of the Russian government, although attendance also risks "greater legitimacy on a government that has been accused of some less-than-legitimate activities as of late." Nikolay Petrov of the Carnegie Moscow Center identified Valdai as "a project used as blatant propaganda by the Kremlin" while Russian sociologist Lilia Shevtsova criticized the Valdai conferences in an article entitled "Putin's Useful Idiots." Marcel H. Van Herpen wrote that Valdai was a soft power effort by the Kremlin in service of Russian foreign policy goals, with Russian leadership using the conference in a bid to gain goodwill among Western intellectuals, create networking opportunities between Russian and Western elites, and "create a testing ground for the Kremlin's foreign policy initiatives." Angus Roxburgh wrote that RIA Novosti was important to the establishment of Valdai during Putin's second term, and that the conference plays a key role in the Russian government's effort to burnish Putin's image and influence outsiders. Nikolay Petrov also wrote that the club has increasingly become a "propaganda tool."

Annual meetings

See also
2014 Valdai speech of Vladimir Putin
Yaroslavl Global Policy Forum

References 

Think tanks based in Russia
2004 establishments in Russia
Vladimir Putin